Mohamed Mohsin (born 1 August 1965) is a retired Bangladeshi footballer who played as a goalkeeper. He is considered to be one of the best goalkeepers to play for the Bangladesh national team and also captaind his country in 1991. He also captained Mohammedan SC, Abahani Limited Dhaka and Muktijoddha SKC.

Club career
While studying in Motijheel Ideal High School, Mohsin got a chance to practice with Dhaka Second Division side Railway Blues at the Shahjahanpur ground in his neighbourhood. He caught the eye of Abahani Krira Chakra captain Ashrafuddin Ahmed Chunnu during the Sher-e-Bangla Cup, and joined the Dhaka League side in 1979. As he was the third choice keeper at Abahani, he moved to their rivals Mohammedan SC in 1982, for more game time. Mohsin replaced Lal Mohammed as the club's first choice keeper, after the veteran abruptly left football. He made a name for himself that year during the Dhaka Derby when he saved a penalty kick from Kazi Salahuddin. He ended his career in 1995 while playing for Muktijoddha SKC, after suffering from a long-term knee injury.

International career
Mohsin made his international debut against China during the 1982 Asian Games, replacing an out of favour Abdul Motaleb in the starting XI. During the same tournament he made crucial saves as Bangladesh defeated Malaysia 2–1, to earn their first ever victory at the Asian Games. In the 1983 Merdeka Cup he saved penalty kick against Algeira, in addition to that, he saved penalties against both Iran and UAE during his decade-long career with Bangladesh. He was the first choice keeper for Bangladesh during the 1986 FIFA World Cup qualifiers and the 1985 South Asian Games. At youth level he played for the Bangladesh U23 team at the 1992 Summer Olympic qualifiers and the Bangladesh U19 at the qualifiers of the 24th Asian Youth Championship. He also captained the senior team to a bronze medal during the 1991 South Asian Games. He last played international football during the 1994 Qatar Independence Cup, when Muktijoddha SKC played as Bangladesh.

Honours

Abahani Limited Dhaka
 Dhaka League = 1981, 1989–90, 1992
 BTC Club Cup = 1991
 Independence Cup = 1990
 Federation Cup = 1988
 Sait Nagjee Trophy = 1989

Mohammedan SC
 Dhaka League = 1982, 1986
 Federation Cup = 1982*, 1983
 Ashis-Jabbar Shield Tournament (India) = 1982

Muktijoddha SKC
 Federation Cup = 1994

 Bangladesh 
 South Asian Games Silver medal: 1984, 1985; Bronze medal: 1991

Awards and accolades
2020 − National Sports Award.
1991 − Sports Writers Association's Best Footballer Award
1988 − Federation Cup Most Valuable Player Award.

References

External links
 

Living people
1965 births
People from Manikganj District
Association football goalkeepers
Bangladeshi footballers
Abahani Limited (Dhaka) players
Mohammedan SC (Dhaka) players
Muktijoddha Sangsad KC players
Asian Games competitors for Bangladesh
Footballers at the 1982 Asian Games
Footballers at the 1986 Asian Games
Bangladesh youth international footballers
Bangladesh international footballers
Recipients of the Bangladesh National Sports Award